Hisayuki (written: 久行, 久之 or 永行) is a masculine Japanese given name. Notable people with the name include:

, Japanese yakuza member
, Japanese long-distance runner
, Japanese golfer
, Japanese anime director, screenwriter and writer

Hisayuki (written: 久行) is also a Japanese surname. Notable people with the name include:
, Japanese animator and character designer

Japanese-language surnames
Japanese masculine given names